Fremd im eigenen Land may refer to:
Fremd im eigenen Land (album), a 2008 album by Fler
"Fremd im eigenen Land" (song), a song by Advanced Chemistry